Makhoni Maria Ntuli (born 10 June 1953) is a South African politician currently serving as a member of the National Assembly of South Africa for the African National Congress. She was elected to the National Assembly in 2019. Ntuli previously served in the KwaZulu-Natal Provincial Legislature.

Since becoming an MP, Ntuli has served on the Portfolio Committee on Public Service and Administration. In the KwaZulu-Natal legislature, she was a member of the PMLPPP Committee and the  Sports and Recreation Committee.

References

External links
Profile at Parliament of South Africa

Living people
1973 births
Zulu people
People from KwaZulu-Natal
Members of the National Assembly of South Africa
Women members of the National Assembly of South Africa
Members of the KwaZulu-Natal Legislature
Women members of provincial legislatures of South Africa
African National Congress politicians